Hydro Sapiens is an art performance performed by The Lunatics from The Netherlands. It premiered in Singapore at Bedok Reservoir on  20 June 2008. It was the official closing performance for the Singapore Arts Festival and was a collaboration with the Singapore International Water Week.

The forty-five minutes play explores the power of water through comedy and drama. 
For every question, there is an answer… What is the power of water? How weak can it make you? Should we fear it, love it, hate it? A human being is made up 66% percent out of water, so why do we need more? And in how many ways a man can drown? For all these questions, The Lunatics will try to find the answers - through a very intensive, hilarious, spectacular and even brutal search for the right value of water....

It featured various special effects like pyrotechnics and impressive machinations. 
Twelve fanatic and truly wet actors, thousand of litres of water, 45 minutes of splashing experiences, countless moments of awe, laughter and silence, and water in your eyes. In 2008 The Lunatics would like to present to you their newest adventure: Hydro Sapiens!

For its premiere, it was open to the public for free. An estimated 5000 people attended the performance

References 

Performances
2008 works